Breech may refer to:

 Breech (firearms), the opening at the rear of a gun barrel where the cartridge is inserted in a breech-loading weapon
 breech, the lower part of a pulley block
 breech, the penetration of a boiler where exhaust gases leave it
 breech birth, when the baby is born feet or bottom first
 breeches, an item of clothing covering the body from the waist down
 buttocks, or breech, the lower part of the human abdomen

People with the surname
 Ernest R. Breech (1897–1978), American businessman, chairman of Ford Motor Company
 Jim Breech (born 1956), American football player

See also
 
 Breach (disambiguation)
 Breeching (disambiguation)